WSUA (1260 AM, "America Radio Miami 1260 AM") is a Spanish news-talk radio station in Miami, Florida. It is currently owned by Grupo Latino de Radio, a subsidiary of the Spanish media conglomerate PRISA. The station is styled along the lines of two big Latin American radio stations, Caracol Radio from Colombia (from which this station got its name) and W Radio from Mexico (which most of its programs are based on, like Hoy por hoy).

History
From 1958 to 1969 the station at 1260 AM had the call letters WAME. Known as "Whammy in Miami", the station had a top 40 format (prior to the startup of WFUN), and was initially a daytimer. The station was popular with teenagers and young adults in the city in the early days of the Rock 'n Roll era, but faded in popularity once WFUN went on the air. The station changed formats, first to "Good Music" (Easy Listening), then to R&B, with noted Miami disc jockey Nickie "Nick With a Positive Kick" Lee. WAME was later sold to Mission Broadcasting after that company divested itself of WRIZ (1550 kHz) in Coral Gables (now WRHC).

In 1969, it traded call letters with then WWOK in Charlotte, North Carolina and adopted a country music format. Mission Broadcasting, the station's owners, added an FM signal, WJOK, which was partially simulcast for a time, and later became WIGL with a totally separate format.

In the early 1980s, the station was sold from Mission Broadcasting to Metroplex, owners of top 40 Y-100. Call letters were changed to WHTT and the station broadcast a black oldies format, with emphasis on Motown and soul, and simulcasted Y-100 overnights. The station shortly thereafter took on a Hispanic format with the call letters WHTT (Radio Hit). After the station was sold again, the call letters became WSUA, Radio Suave, and took on a ballad-oriented format, similar to that of the current Romantica on FM. WSUA has discontinued broadcasting in HD Radio.

As of April 2021, the station was being sold to America CV, but it was dismissed on April 12, 2022.

References

External links
America Radio Miami 1260 AM Facebook
Official Website (in Spanish)
Grupo Latino de Radio Official Website

 
 
FCC History Cards for WSUA

Cuban-American culture in Miami
Hispanic and Latino American culture in Miami
SUA
News and talk radio stations in the United States
SUA
Radio stations established in 1958
1958 establishments in Florida